Imran Uzzaman (born 4 November 1994) is a Bangladeshi cricketer. He made his List A debut for Prime Doleshwar Sporting Club in the 2018–19 Dhaka Premier Division Cricket League on 27 March 2019. He made his first-class debut for Khulna Division in the 2019–20 National Cricket League on 10 October 2019. He made his Twenty20 debut on 31 May 2021, for Prime Doleshwar Sporting Club in the 2021 Dhaka Premier Division Twenty20 Cricket League.

References

External links
 

1994 births
Living people
Bangladeshi cricketers
Khulna Division cricketers
Prime Doleshwar Sporting Club cricketers
People from Jessore District